Knerten Rock is a small isolated rock  north of Vesleskarvet Cliff, in the northwest part of Ahlmann Ridge in Queen Maud Land, Antarctica. It was mapped by Norwegian cartographers from surveys and air photos by the Norwegian–British–Swedish Antarctic Expedition (NBSAE) (1949–52) and air photos by the Norwegian expedition (1958–59) and named Knerten (the nipper).

References

External links

 

Rock formations of Queen Maud Land
Princess Martha Coast